The Rabbit Trap is a 1959 American drama film directed by Philip Leacock based on a 1955 Goodyear Television Playhouse teleplay by JP Miller.

Plot
Since leaving the army ten years ago, Eddie has been working hard without any promotion, never missing a day of work and having only three weeks holiday in his ten years with his construction firm.  The day after, Eddie and his wife Abby and son Duncan are granted a two-week holiday. They spend it in a mountain cabin.  On the first day, Eddie and Duncan place a rabbit trap out in the countryside for the sheer joy of feeding and releasing him.  Eddie is called back to work the next day, leading to arguments with Abby who insists that Eddie should remain on holiday.  Eddie fears being left behind in promotion if he endangers his reputation for reliability.

Upon returning home, Duncan realizes they left the trap set and a rabbit could be trapped inside.  Duncan breaks his piggy bank and returns to the mountains by himself to save the rabbit and tries to take the bus to Deep Springs to save the rabbit.

In the midst of this, his Dad gets a promotion and Judy kisses the owner of the construction firm and gives her one-week notice.

Eddie decided that it is more important to bring his son back to check the rabbit trap than his promotion and quits.

Cast

Ernest Borgnine: Eddie Colt
David Brian: Everett Spellman
Bethel Leslie: Abby Colt
Kevin Corcoran: Duncan Colt
June Blair: Judy Colt
Christopher Dark: Gerry
Jeanette Nolan: Mrs. Colt
Russell Collins: Hughie Colt
Don Rickles: Mike O'Halloran

References

External links

The Rabbit Trap at TCMDB
The Rabbit Trap at New York Times

1959 drama films
1959 films
American black-and-white films
American drama films
Films based on television plays
Films directed by Philip Leacock
Films produced by Burt Lancaster
Films produced by James Hill
Films produced by Harold Hecht
Films produced by Harry Kleiner
Films scored by Jack Marshall
Films set in California
Norma Productions films
United Artists films
1950s English-language films
1950s American films